Versuriga is a monotypic genus of jellyfishes belonging to the monotypic family Versurigidae. The only species is Versuriga anadyomene.

References

Mastigiidae
Scyphozoan genera
Monotypic cnidarian genera